Megan Lynn Gibson-Loftin (born March 25, 1986) is an American, former collegiate All-American, professional softball pitcher and current pitching coach at Houston. Gibson-Loftin played college softball for Texas A&M where she is the career leader in offense walks and led them to a runner-up finish at the 2008 Women's College World Series. She also ranks top-10 in the latter category and home runs in the Big 12 Conference. She was selected by the Philadelphia Force as the second overall pick in the 2008 NPF Draft, eventually playing for four seasons. After the Force folded she was picked up by the Tennessee Diamonds in 2010.

Career

College
Born Megan Lynn Gibson in Spring, Texas, Gibson-Loftin played college softball at Texas A&M from 2004 to 2008. In the 2008 season, she was collegiate national player of the week from February 25 to March 2. She led her team to win the program's second Big 12 regular season and first tournament championship. In the postseason, she led her team to the Final Series of the 2008 Women's College World Series. Gibson ended her senior season as runner-up for USA Softball Collegiate Player of the Year honors, as a first-team NFCA All-American, and the first player to win both Player of the Year and Pitcher of the Year honors from the Big 12.

She graduated from Texas A&M in 2008 with a bachelor's degree in sport management with a minor in business.

Professional career
Gibson-Loftin played professional softball for National Pro Fastpitch from 2008 to 2011. The second overall pick in the 2008 NPF draft selected by the Philadelphia Force, Gibson-Loftin played for the Force from 2008 to 2009 and for the Tennessee (later NPF) Diamonds from 2010 to 2011. In 2009, Gibson-Loftin played for Denso of Women's Major League Softball in Japan.

Coaching career
Along with her career in the NPF, Gibson served under Texas A&M head coach Jo Evans as a graduate assistant in Fall 2008 and again as a volunteer pitching coach during the 2011 season. She also spent time as a softball instructor at High Performance Baseball in Tomball and as a volunteer assistant coach at Spring High School in 2010.

Gibson joined the Penn State coaching staff after spending two seasons as an assistant under Coach Lehotak at University of Texas at San Antonio.

Personal life
Gibson-Loftin married Lance Loftin, a former professional baseball player who played college baseball at Texas State, in 2015.

Career statistics

References

External links
 

Penn State bio

1986 births
Living people
American expatriate sportspeople in Japan
Texas A&M Aggies softball players
American softball coaches
Texas A&M Aggies softball coaches
Houston Cougars softball coaches
Penn State Nittany Lions softball coaches
People from Spring, Texas
Philadelphia Force players
Sportspeople from Harris County, Texas
Softball players from Texas
Carolina Diamonds players